Cuboideonavicular ligament may refer to:

 Dorsal cuboideonavicular ligament
 Plantar cuboideonavicular ligament